Albert Bousser (8 February 1906 – 2 May 1995) was a Luxembourgish politician, railway inspector, and trade unionist.

Born on 8 February 1906 in Alzingen, Bousser studied in Paris at the École du génie civil, after which he became a railway inspector for Chemins de Fer Luxembourgeois, in which capacity he worked until 1969.  He worked for the railway workers' union, first as Secretary (1945–1954) and later as President (1954–1964).

Bousser first entered the Chamber of Deputies in 1946, as he would remain until 1964, when he became a government minister, as Minister for Transport and Minister for Public Works (1964–1969).   He briefly sat on the communal council of Luxembourg City (1950–1951), before moving to Howald, in Hesperange and serving as Mayor of Hesperange.  During this time, he was President of the LSAP from 1952 to 1954.

He was instrumental, in 1971, to forming the Social Democratic Party.  He was elected to the Chamber of Deputies again in the 1974 election, in which he sat until 1979.

|-

|-

References 

Ministers for Public Works of Luxembourg
Ministers for Transport of Luxembourg
Mayors of Hesperange
Members of the Chamber of Deputies (Luxembourg)
Councillors in Luxembourg City
Luxembourg Socialist Workers' Party politicians
Social Democratic Party (Luxembourg) politicians
Luxembourgian trade unionists
Luxembourgian people in rail transport
1906 births
1995 deaths
People from Hesperange
Luxembourgian writers
Luxembourgian expatriates in France